The Aérospatiale (formerly Sud Aviation) SA 321 Super Frelon ("Super Hornet") is a three-engined heavy transport helicopter produced by aerospace manufacturer Sud Aviation of France. It held the distinction of being the most powerful helicopter to be built in Europe at one point, as well as being the world's fastest helicopter.

The Super Frelon was a more powerful development of the original SE.3200 Frelon, which had failed to enter production. On 7 December 1962, the first prototype conducted the type's maiden flight. Both civilian and military versions of the Super Frelon were produced; the type was predominantly sold to military customers. In 1981, Aerospatiale, Sud Aviation's successor company, chose to terminate production due to a lack of orders.

The Super Frelon was most heavily used by naval air arms, such as the French Navy and the People's Liberation Army Naval Air Force. On 30 April 2010, the type was retired by the French Navy, having been replaced by a pair of Eurocopter EC225 helicopters as a stopgap measure pending the availability of the NHIndustries NH90 helicopter. The Super Frelon was in use for an extended period within China, where it was manufactured under license and sold by the Harbin Aircraft Industry Group as the Harbin Z-8. A modernised derivative of the Z-8, marketed as the Avicopter AC313, performed its first flight on 18 March 2010.

Development

Background
The SA.3210 Super Frelon was developed by French aerospace company Sud Aviation from the original SE.3200 Frelon. During the type's development, Sud Aviation had risen to prominence as a major helicopter manufacturer, having exported more rotorcraft than any other European rival. Having produced the popular Aérospatiale Alouette II and Aérospatiale Alouette III, the firm was keen to establish a range of helicopters fulfilling various roles, functions, and size requirements; two of the larger models in development by the early 1960s were the Super Frelon and what would become the Aérospatiale SA 330 Puma. The Super Frelon was the largest helicopter in development by the firm, being substantially increased over the earlier Frelon, and was considered to be an ambitious design at the time.

The earlier Frelon had been developed to meet the requirements of both the French Navy and the German Navy, which both had released details on its anticipated demands for a heavy helicopter; however, these requirements were revised upwards by the customer, leading to the redesign and emergence of the Super Frelon.

Additional external changes between the Frelon and Super Frelon had been made, such as the original stubby tail boom having been replaced by a more conventional one, albeit with a crank in it to raise the tail rotor clear of vehicles approaching the rear loading ramp. Taking note of American experiments with amphibious helicopters, the Super Frelon's fuselage was redesigned into a hull, featuring a bow, planing bottom and watertight bilge compartments. Various foreign manufacturers participated in the development and manufacturing of the type; American helicopter company Sikorsky was contracted to supply the design of a new six-bladed main rotor and five-bladed tail rotor, while Italian manufacturer Fiat supplied the design for a new main transmission.

Into flight
On 7 December 1962, the first prototype Super Frelon conducted the type's maiden flight. On 28 May 1963, it was followed by the second prototype. The first prototype was tailored towards meeting the needs of the French Air Force, while the second was fully navalised, including lateral stabilising floats fixed to the undercarriage. On 23 July 1963, a modified prototype Super Frelon helicopter was used to break the FAI absolute helicopter world speed record, having attained a maximum speed of  during the flight. Flown by Jean Boulet and Roland Coffignot, a total of three international records were broken, these being: speed over 3 km at low altitude,
; speed at any altitude over 15 and 25 km, ; and 100km closed circuit .

By April 1964, the two prototypes had accumulated 388 flying hours, which included 30 hours of seaworthiness trials performed with the second prototype. In January 1964, the third Super Frelon prototype made its first flight, the fourth first flew during May 1964, and a pair of pre-production models were completed during the latter half of 1964. The third prototype participated in a series of accelerated wear trials to establish component endurance and overhaul lifespan, while the fourth prototype was assigned to further tests of equipment for the naval environment. 

By July 1964, the French Government had placed an initial order for the Super Frelon, intended to perform logistic support duties at the Centre Experimental du Pacifique; negotiations for a further order was already being negotiated for the naval version, which were to be equipped for anti-submarine duties. However, West German support for the Super Frelon programme had already declined by this point, partially due to interest in the rival Sikorsky SH-3 Sea King, which was evaluated against the type.

Both civilian and military versions of the Super Frelon were built, with the military variants being the most numerous by far, entering service with the French military as well as being exported to Israel, South Africa, Libya, China and Iraq. Three military variants were produced: military transport, anti-submarine and anti-ship. The transport version is able to carry 38 equipped troops, or alternatively 15 stretchers for casualty evacuation tasks.

Design

The Aérospatiale SA 321 Super Frelon is a large, heavy-lift single-rotor helicopter, furnished with a relatively atypical three-engine configuration; these are Turboméca Turmo IIIC turboshaft engines set on top of the fuselage, a pair of turbines positioned side by side at the front and one located aft of the main rotor. The naval anti-submarine and anti-ship variants are usually equipped with navigation and search radar (ORB-42), and a 50-metre rescue cable. They are most often fitted with a 20 mm cannon, countermeasures, night vision, a laser designator and a Personal Locator System. The Super Frelon can also be fitted for inflight refueling.

The front engines have simple individual ram intakes, while the rear one is fitted with a semi-circular scoop to provide air; all three bifurcated exhausts are near to the rotor head. The three engines and the reduction gearbox are mounted on a horizontal bulkhead and firewall which forms the roof of the cabin and upper structural member of the fuselage. The engines are isolated by multiple firewalls, including transverse firewalls separating front and rear engines from the rotor gearbox, and zonal engine firewalls. Eight sturdy hinged doors provide access to the compact Turmo engines, which have ample space around them to enable ground crew to service them without using external platforms.

The fuselage is actually a hull, which makes use of a semi-monocoque light alloy construction; according to aerospace publication Flight International, the hull design was "reminiscent of flying-boat engineering". The main cabin lacks any transverse bracing, except for a single bulkhead between the cockpit and cabin. Substantial built-up frames connect the strengthened roof structure with the floor/planing-bottom of transverse under-floor bulkheads and outer skin. A conventional exterior skin is used, employing longitudinal stiffeners as well as two lines of deep channel members, while the under-floor cross members are reinforced with vertical stiffeners. There is no keel, at the floor level there are horizontal members between frames which are stiffened by transverse shear angles. Flexible fuel cells are stored in four watertight under-floor compartments lying fore and aft of the rotor axis, while the floor itself is fitted with removable panels. A hatch set into the floor, positioned approximately underneath the rotor axis, is used for sling-load operations.

At the rear of the cabin is a tapered section of simple semi-monocoque construction, which is closed by a robust hinged rear loading ramp, which serves as the main entrance for bulky loads or equipment. The loading ramp is jettisonable in emergency situations. Additionally, there is a sliding door located on the forward starboard side, while a small hinged emergency door is set on the aft port side. The tail boom uses conventional semi-monocoque construction, supported by closely spaced notched channel-section frames and continuous stringers, absent of any major longitudinal sections or longerons. The cranked section carrying the tail rotor and trim plane is more robust, strengthened by a solid-web spar, frames, and stiffeners. Along the top of the boom, the shaft for the tail rotor is covered by a fairing.

The fixed landing gear has twin wheels on each of the three vertical shock absorber-equipped struts. The main leading gear units are mounted on triangulated tubular structures, while the nose gear is bracketed to the cockpit bulkhead via a watertight seal in the planing bottom. The main wheels have hydraulic brakes operated from the pedals, complete with a parking hand brake, while the nose unit is fully castoring. The nose, which is covered by large glazed panels, has a bow chine and planing bottom built as a unit with the flight deck, which is higher than the main cabin floor.

Operational history

China

From December 1975 to April 1977, China took delivery of a batch of 12 SA 321 Super Frelon navalised helicopters. These helicopters came in two variants: anti-submarine warfare (ASW) and search and rescue (SAR) versions. The Super Frelon was the first helicopter of the People's Liberation Army (PLA) to be capable of operating from the flight deck of surface vessels. 

China has also manufactured a number of Super Frelons locally, where it is known under the designation Z-8 (land-or-ship based ASW/SAR helicopter). The Super Frelon remains operational with the PLA Navy as of 2014.

Since the early 1980s, the Super Frelons have been frequently used by the People's Liberation Army Navy (PLAN) for conducting shipborne ASW and SAR operations. For ASW missions, the Z-8 is equipped with surface search radar and a French HS-12 dipping sonar while carrying a Whitehead A244S torpedo under the starboard side of the fuselage. The rotorcraft were also used to ferry supplies from replenishment ship to surface combatants, and transport marines from the landing ship to the shore. 

A naval SAR version, designated as the Z-8S, was outfitted with upgraded avionics, a  searchlight, FLIR turret and a hoist, made its first flight in December 2004. Another rescue variant, furnished with dedicated medivac equipment on board, was also developed for the Navy, designated as the Z-8JH.

The Z-8A version was developed as an army transport variant and received certification in February 1999. In 2001, a pair of Z-8As were delivered to the Army for evaluation, however, it ultimately decided to procure additional Mi-17V5s instead. Only a single batch of about six Z-8A were delivered to the Army in November 2002; these still retained the nose weather radar and side floats. Starting in 2007, the People's Liberation Army Air Force (PLAAF) also acquired dozens of upgraded Z-8Ks and Z-8KAs for conducting SAR missions; these were equipped with a FLIR turret and a searchlight underneath the cabin, plus a hoist and a flare dispenser.

China has also developed a domestic civil helicopter variant of the Z-8, which is marketed as the Avicopter AC313. The AC313 has a maximum takeoff weight of 13.8 tonnes, is capable of carrying up to 27 passengers, and has a maximum range of 900 km (559 miles).

After the 2008 Sichuan earthquake, Z-8 helicopter production received a massive boost as the event had proved the helicopter's value in humanitarian missions. New engine acquisition and design changes were implemented in order to iron out some of known existing issues which had affected the Z-8 for decades. The Chinese People's Armed Police ordered 18 Z-8 helicopters; by 2013, at least five helicopters had been delivered, the majority of these having been assigned to forestry fire fighting units. During subsequent earthquake relief operations, Z-8 helicopters have been deployed to perform rescue and logistical missions.

In 2018, the PLA Army Aviation announced that it would begin phasing out its fleet of Z-8 helicopters due to low performance and high maintenance requirements, even though some examples have only been in service for 6 years, the Z-8s will likely to be replaced by the Harbin Z-20 medium lift helicopter.

France
In October 1965, the SA 321G ASW helicopter joined the French Naval Aviation (Aeronavale). Apart from ship-based ASW missions, the SA321G also carried out sanitisation patrols in support of Redoutable-class ballistic missile submarines. Some aircraft were modified with nose-mounted targeting radar for 'Exocet' anti-ship missiles. Five SA321GA freighters, originally used in support of the Pacific nuclear test centre, were transferred to assault support duties.

In 2003, the surviving Aeronavale Super Frelons were assigned to transport duties, including commando transport, VertRep and SAR.

The SA321G Super Frelon served with Flotille 32F of the French Aviation navale, operating from Lanvéoc-Poulmic in Brittany in the Search and Rescue role. They were retired on 30 April 2010, replaced by two Eurocopter EC225 helicopters purchased as stop-gaps until the NHIndustries NH90 came into service in 2011–12.

Iraq
Starting in 1977, a total of 16 Super Frelons were delivered to the Iraqi Air Force; equipped with radar and Exocet missiles, the Iraqi models were designated as the SA 321H. These rotorcraft were deployed in the lengthy Iran–Iraq War and during the 1991 Gulf War, in which at least one example was destroyed.

During the Iran–Iraq War, Iraq started using Super Frelon and its other newly purchased Exocet-equipped fighters to target Iranian shipping in Persian Gulf in an event now known as the Tanker War. Two of the Iraqi Super Frelons were downed by Iranian fighters, one by a long-range shot of AIM-54A Phoenix by an F-14 Tomcat (during Operation Pearl) while under way over Persian Gulf, and one by an AGM-65A Maverick fired from an Iranian F-4 Phantom in July 1986, while attempting to take off from an oil rig.

Israel

During 1965, Israel placed an order for six SA 321K Super Frelons to equip the Israeli Air Force with a heavy lift transport capability. On 20 April 1966, the first of these rotorcraft arrived, enabling the inauguration of 114 Squadron, which operated the type out of Tel Nof. An additional six Super Frelons were ordered during the following year. 

The Israeli military had initially hoped to use the Super Frelons for deploying Panhard AML-90 light armoured cars in support of airborne operations, but this concept was dropped when tests revealed the helicopter was incapable of handling the vehicle's combat weight. A total of four helicopters had arrived by the start of the 1967 Six-Day War, during which they flew 41 sorties. Israeli Super Frelons saw extensive service during the War of Attrition, participating in operations such as Helem, Tarnegol 53 and Rhodes.

The type was once again in service during the Yom Kippur War, following which Israel replaced the original Turbomeca Turmo engines with the  General Electric T58-GE-T5D engine. The Super Frelons also took part in the Israeli invasion of Lebanon in June 1982. Due to their relatively high maintenance cost and poor performance capabilities compared to the IAF CH-53s, they were eventually retired in 1991.

Libya
During 1980–1981, six radar-equipped SA 321GM helicopters and eight SA 321M SAR/transports were delivered to Libya.

South Africa
South Africa ordered sixteen SA 321L helicopters in 1965, which were delivered by 1967 and adopted by the South African Air Force (SAAF)'s 15 Squadron. At least two were deployed to Mozambique in support of Rhodesian military operations against insurgents of the Zimbabwe African National Liberation Army between 1978 and 1979. Others were mobilised for evacuating South African paratroops from Angola during Operation Reindeer. 

In August 1978, the South West African People's Organization sparked a major border incident between South Africa and Zambia when its guerrillas fired on an SAAF Super Frelon landing at Katima Mulilo from Zambian soil. The South Africans retaliated with an artillery strike, which struck a Zambian Army position.

Syria

In October 1975, it was widely reported that Syria had ordered fifteen unspecified Super Frelons from France as part of an arms deal funded by Saudi Arabia. While the Syrian Air Force did issue a requirement for fifteen of the specific aircraft, and recommended purchasing up to fifty, by 1984 the sale had still not materialized.

Variants

 SE.3200 Frelon  Prototype transport helicopter powered by three 597 kW (800 hp) Turbomeca Turmo IIIB engines driving a four-bladed rotor of 15.2 m (50 ft) diameter. Two built, the first flying on 10 June 1958.
 SA 321  Preproduction aircraft. Four built.
 SA 321G  Anti-submarine warfare version for the French Navy, it was powered by three Turbomeca IIIC-6 turboshaft engines; 26 built.
 SA 321Ga  Utility and assault transport helicopter for the French Navy.
 SA 321GM  Export version for Libya, fitted with Omera ORB-32WAS radar.
 SA 321H  Export version for Iraq, it was powered by three Turbomeca Turmo IIIE turboshaft engines, fitted with Omera ORB-31D search radar, and armed with Exocet anti-ship missiles.
 SA 321F  Commercial airline helicopter, powered by three Turbomeca IIIC-3 turboshaft engines, with accommodation for 34 to 37 passengers.
 SA 321J  Commercial transport helicopter and accommodation for 27 passengers.
 SA 321Ja  Improved version of the SA 321J.
 SA 321K  Military transport version for Israel.
 SA 321L  Military transport version for South Africa, fitted with air inlet filters.
 SA 321M  Search and rescue, utility transport helicopter for Libya.
 Changhe Z-8  Chinese built version with three Changzhou Lan Xiang WZ6 turboshaft engines.
 Changhe Z-8A  Army transport.
 Changhe Z-8F  Chinese built version with Pratt & Whitney Canada PT6B-67A turboshaft engines.
 Changhe Z-8AEW  Chinese AEW helicopter with retractable radar antenna, AESA radar, 360 degree coverage, redesigned nose similar to the AC313, and FLIR.
 Changhe Z-8L  Chinese variant with wide-body fuselage and enlarged fuel sponsons, first spotted in January 2019. The internal width of the load area has been increased from 1.8m to 2.4 m, making it larger than old Z-8 and SA321 variants.

Operators

 People's Liberation Army Air Force  
 People's Liberation Army Ground Force
 People's Liberation Army Navy

 
 French Naval Aviation

 Olympic Airways

 Indonesian Air Force
 Pelita Air Service

 Iraqi Air Force

 Israeli Air Force

 Libyan Air Force
 Libyan Navy

 South African Air Force

 Air Force of Zaire

Specifications (Naval Super Frelon)

See also

References

Citations

Bibliography

 Donald, David and Jon Lake. Encyclopedia of World Military Aircraft. London: Aerospace Publishing, Single Volume Edition, 1996. .
 Grolleau, Henri-Paul. "French Navy Super Hornets". Air International, May 2009, Vol 76 No. 5. Stamford, UK:Key Publishing.  ISSN 0306-5634. pp. 56–60.
 Grolleau, Henri-Pierre. "Hello EC225, Goodbye Super Frelon". Air International, June 2010, Vol 78 No. 6. UK:Key Publishing.  ISSN 0306-5634. p. 12.

 Stevens, James Hay. "Super Frelon: Western Europe's Most Powerful Helicopter". Flight International, 9 July 1964. pp. 55–59.
 Taylor, John W.R. Jane's All The World's Aircraft 1966–1967, London: Sampson Low, Marston & Company, 1966.
 Taylor, J.W.R. Jane's All the World's Aircraft 1976–77. London:Macdonald and Jane's, 1976. .

1960s French military transport aircraft
Aérospatiale aircraft
Changhe aircraft
Amphibious helicopters
1960s French helicopters
Military transport helicopters
Three-turbine helicopters
Aircraft first flown in 1962